Intelligence amplification (IA) (also referred to as cognitive augmentation, machine augmented intelligence and enhanced intelligence) refers to the effective use of information technology in augmenting human intelligence. The idea was first proposed in the 1950s and 1960s by cybernetics and early computer pioneers.

IA is sometimes contrasted with AI (artificial intelligence), that is, the project of building a human-like intelligence in the form of an autonomous technological system such as a computer or robot. AI has encountered many fundamental obstacles, practical as well as theoretical, which for IA seem moot, as it needs technology merely as an extra support for an autonomous intelligence that has already proven to function. Moreover, IA has a long history of success, since all forms of information technology, from the abacus to writing to the Internet, have been developed basically to extend the information processing capabilities of the human mind (see extended mind and distributed cognition).

Major contributions

William Ross Ashby: Intelligence Amplification

The term intelligence amplification (IA) has enjoyed a wide currency since William Ross Ashby wrote of "amplifying intelligence" in his Introduction to Cybernetics (1956). Related ideas were explicitly proposed as an alternative to Artificial Intelligence by Hao Wang from the early days of automatic theorem provers.

J. C. R. Licklider: Man-Computer Symbiosis
"Man-Computer Symbiosis" is a key speculative paper published in 1960 by psychologist/computer scientist J.C.R. Licklider, which envisions that mutually-interdependent, "living together", tightly-coupled human brains and computing machines would prove to complement each other's strengths to a high degree:

In Licklider's vision, many of the pure artificial intelligence systems envisioned at the time by over-optimistic researchers would prove unnecessary. (This paper is also seen by some historians as marking the genesis of ideas about computer networks which later blossomed into the Internet).

Douglas Engelbart: Augmenting Human Intellect

Licklider's research was similar in spirit to his DARPA contemporary and protégé Douglas Engelbart. Both had a view of how computers could be used that was both at odds with the then-prevalent views (which saw them as devices principally useful for computations), and key proponents of the way in which computers are now used (as generic adjuncts to humans).

Engelbart reasoned that the state of our current technology controls our ability to manipulate information, and that fact in turn will control our ability to develop new, improved technologies. He thus set himself to the revolutionary task of developing computer-based technologies for manipulating information directly, and also to improve individual and group processes for knowledge-work. Engelbart's philosophy and research agenda is most clearly and directly expressed in the 1962 research report: Augmenting Human Intellect: A Conceptual Framework The concept of network augmented intelligence is attributed to Engelbart based on this pioneering work.

Engelbart subsequently implemented these concepts in his Augmented Human Intellect Research Center at SRI International, developing essentially an intelligence amplifying system of tools (NLS) and co-evolving organizational methods, in full operational use by the mid-1960s within the lab. As intended, his R&D team experienced increasing degrees of intelligence amplification, as both rigorous users and rapid-prototype developers of the system. For a sampling of research results, see their 1968 Mother of All Demos.

Later contributions
Howard Rheingold worked at Xerox PARC in the 1980s and was introduced to both Bob Taylor and Douglas Engelbart; Rheingold wrote about "mind amplifiers" in his 1985 book, Tools for Thought.
Andrews Samraj mentioned in "Skin-Close Computing and Wearable Technology" 2021, about Human augmentation by two varieties of cyborgs, namely, Hard cyborgs and Soft cyborgs. A humanoid walking machine is an example of the soft cyborg and a pace-maker is an example for augmenting human as a hard cyborg.

Arnav Kapur working at MIT wrote about human-AI coalescence: how AI can be integrated into human condition as part of "human self": as a tertiary layer to the human brain to augment human cognition. He demonstrates this using a peripheral nerve-computer interface, AlterEgo, which enables a human user to silently and internally converse with a personal AI.

In 2014 the technology of Artificial Swarm Intelligence was developed to amplify the intelligence of networked human groups using AI algorithms modeled on biological swarms. The technology enables small teams to make predictions, estimations and medical diagnoses at accuracy levels that significantly exceed natural human intelligence.

Shan Carter and Michael Nielsen introduce the concept of artificial intelligence augmentation (AIA): the use of AI systems to help develop new methods for intelligence augmentation. They contrast cognitive outsourcing (AI as an oracle, able to solve some large class of problems with better-than-human performance) with cognitive transformation (changing the operations and representations we use to think). A calculator is an example of the former; a spreadsheet of the latter.

Ron Fulbright describes human cognitive augmentation in human/cog ensembles involving humans working in collaborative partnership with cognitive systems (called cogs). By working together, human/cog ensembles achieve results superior to those obtained by the humans working alone or the cognitive systems working alone. The human component of the ensemble is therefore cognitively augmented. The degree of augmentation depends on the proportion of the total amount of cognition done by the human and that done by the cog. Six Levels of Cognitive Augmentation have been identified:

In science fiction

Augmented intelligence has been a repeating theme in science fiction. A positive view of brain implants used to communicate with a computer as a form of augmented intelligence is seen in Algis Budrys 1976 novel Michaelmas. Fear that the technology will be misused by the government and military is an early theme. In the 1981 BBC serial The Nightmare Man the pilot of a high-tech mini submarine is linked to his craft via a brain implant but becomes a savage killer after ripping out the implant.

Perhaps the most well known writer exploring themes of intelligence augmentation is William Gibson, in work such as his 1981 story "Johnny Mnemonic", in which the title character has computer-augmented memory, and his 1984 novel Neuromancer, in which computer hackers interface through brain-computer interfaces to computer systems. Vernor Vinge, as discussed earlier, looked at intelligence augmentation as a possible route to the technological singularity, a theme which also appears in his fiction.

See also

 Advanced chess
 Augmented learning
 Brain–computer interface
 Charles Sanders Peirce
 Collective intelligence
 Democratic transhumanism
 Emotiv Systems
 Extelligence
 Exocortex
 Knowledge worker
 Mechanization
 Neuroenhancement
 Noogenesis
 Nootropic
 Sensemaking (information science)
 The Wisdom of Crowds

References

Further reading

 
 Licklider's biography, contains discussion of the importance of this paper.

External links
Intelligence Amplification using speech synthesis technology
IT Conversations: Doug Engelbart - Large-Scale Collective IQ
7 December 1951, Ashby first wrote about the possibility to build an 'information amplifier'.
12 August 1953, Ashby mentioned an objection to his 'intelligence-amplifier'.

History of human–computer interaction
Cybernetics
Biocybernetics
Transhumanism
Texts related to the history of the Internet
Intelligence